General elections were held in Malawi on 29 and 30 June 1983. As the country had become a one-party state in 1966, the Malawi Congress Party was the sole legal party at the time. The number of seats was increased to 101, whilst President-for-life Hastings Banda was able to appoint as many additional members as he saw fit to "enhance the representative character of the Assembly, or to represent
particular minority or other special interests in the Republic." Ultimately, an additional 11 members were appointed.

In 21 constituencies there was only a single MCP candidate, who was elected unopposed. In the remaining 80 seats there were between two and five candidates, all of which were for the MCP.

Results

References

1983 in Malawi
Elections in Malawi
One-party elections
Malawi
June 1983 events in Africa
Election and referendum articles with incomplete results